Social Seating is a type of social networking service that allows users to choose their seatmates based on their personal preferences and social network profiles. Social seating is a system that uses data from Facebook, LinkedIn, Twitter and other social networks, to allow users to look at people with similar interests and then book a seat accordingly. Social seating is an opt-in system, meaning that passengers or clients of a service that implements a social seating program will not have their information pulled unless they willingly agree to it. Social seating is currently available with a few airlines, notably KLM and Malaysia Airlines, and also for music events via Ticketmaster.

Applications
Social Seating can be used for various industries including flights, trains, theaters, sport events etc. In the flight industry, airlines use this technology to allow their customers to choose potential flight partners based on personal information gathered from social networks such as Facebook, LinkedIn, or Twitter. For example, with KLM's Meet and Seat program, passengers are able to go into the system a minimum of forty eight hours before their flight departs to edit their profile, browse the profiles of other passengers, and view a seating map showing where other people who have opted in are sitting. There are different levels of social integration, however, as other companies, such as the Hong Kong-based Satisfly, allow passengers to submit what "mood" they are in with regards to whether they want to talk to who is sitting next to them, chat casually, listen to music alone, or even sleep. This technology can give potential travelers more control over where they sit and how they interact with people on their flights. For instance, sales professionals can determine their flight based on the passengers, allowing businesses to gain potential customers by situating themselves on a plane to make sales pitches. In addition, airlines can use the information provided by these systems to have more personal relationships with their passengers through their access to information such as upcoming birthdays and anniversaries.

Availability
This technology is currently predominantly being used for airlines, however, Eran Savir, the founder of social seating service SeatID, has stated that this is only the first step and that he hopes that this technology will continue to spread to theaters, sporting events, trains, and any other services in which people book seats. One instance of this is the popular ticket-buying service Ticketmaster. In 2011 the company expanded its service to allow users to tag where they are sitting at events and to share that information with their Facebook friends so that they can pick seats close to where they are sitting. In 2012 Ticketmaster took this a step further by adding a new app which can recommend nearby concerts based on what artists a user listens to based on what they are listening to on services such as Spotify and Rdio.

Privacy Concerns
Despite the added social benefits that social seating can provide, such as networking, meeting new people, etc., there have been some concerns raised over the topic because there are those who believe that social seating could lead to stalking, and others are even concerned that the companies in charge of these systems will share the extracted data with third parties for profit. According to Savir, however, all of this personal information is already available to airlines if a user has "liked" their page, so using a social seating program really tells airlines nothing more than they already know except for where a passenger is sitting. In addition, some companies such as KLM's Meet & Seat have promised that they won't share personal information such as this with third parties, and that passengers are prohibited from using information from other passengers' profiles to infringe upon their rights. Despite these assurances, some companies are still unwilling to implement social seating programs, not just because of a lack of demand, but because they still feel that there is the potential for misuse. As Ali Bullock, Cathay Pacific's digital and social manager, stated, "It’s got to be in the interest of the passengers, and we feel there are privacy issues surrounding the idea of social seating".

Notes

References
 Social seating one year on: move over airlines – hotels, rail and events get a piece of the action
 Social seating: First airlines, then everything else
 Flying Around The World Could Get A Lot More Social This Fall
 Selecting a Seatmate to Make Skies Friendlier
 Love in the air: plane software lets you pick travelling companion
 Airlines harvest passenger details in 'spooky' plan to reel in new customers
 Is this seat taken? Airlines add 'social seating' programs
 Tech: Focus on social seating

Seating